Zhana Todorova (born 6 January 1997) is a Bulgarian volleyball player, playing as a libero. She is part of the Bulgaria women's national volleyball team.

She competed at the 2013 Women's European Volleyball Championship, the 2015 European Games, and 2021 Women's European Volleyball League, winning a gold medal.

At club level she played for VC Maritsa in 2015.

References

1997 births
Living people
Bulgarian women's volleyball players
Place of birth missing (living people)
European Games competitors for Bulgaria
Volleyball players at the 2015 European Games
Liberos